V. Vaidyanathan is Managing Director and CEO of IDFC First Bank Before this, he was heading ICICI Prudential Life Insurance and served on the Board of ICICI Bank.

Education 
V. Vaidyanathan is an alumnus of Birla Institute of Technology, Mesra. He also completed his Advanced Management Program from Harvard Business School, Boston.

Early life 
Vaidyanathan was born in Chennai. One of his childhood's fondest memories was traveling by train to Chennai for annual leave, the same location every year. He spent the early days of his childhood studying in Kendriya Vidyalaya across the country.

He got admission to Birla Institute of Technology in Ranchi, but ran out of money to buy train tickets. His mathematics teacher Mr. Saini then lent him Rs. 500 to take a train to help him appear for an interview for Birla Institute of Technology Ranchi. Vaidyanathan searched for him for over 30 years but couldn't find him. One fine day ICICI Staff skip-traced his teacher in Agra, whom he then called to thank him profusely. Vaidyanathan later gifted him one lakh equity shares, amounting to Rs 30 lakhs at the time of transfer.

Career 
Vaidyanathan began his career at Citibank, and worked there from 1990 to 2000 in consumer banking. In 1999–2000, when ICICI decided to foray into Retail lending from Project Lending, he joined them to spearhead the Retail businesses. His responsibility included setting up the businesses including all key functions related to these businesses like strategy, team building, business relationships, Credit policy, Credit administration and risk management.

He joined ICICI when it was a Domestic Financial Institution (DFI) known for project financing, and the retail business he built helped the transition of ICICI from a DFI to a Universal Bank. He was appointed MD and CEO of ICICI Personal Financial Services (PFS) Limited at 32, and built the Retail Lending Business for ICICI since its inception. In 2002, ICICI Limited merged with its subsidiary ICICI bank and with ICICI PFS Limited. Post the merger, he became the Head of Retail Banking in charge of both Lending and Retail Liabilities in the merged entity, ICICI Bank Limited. He grew the retail business to over 1400 bank branches in 800 cities, 25 million customers, a vast CASA and retail deposit base, branch, internet and digital banking, and built a retail loan book of over Rs. 1.35 trillion in Mortgages, Auto loans, Commercial Vehicles, Credit Cards and Personal Loans. As an additional responsibility, he also built the ICICI Bank's SME business in 2003, and managed the Rural Banking Business after 2007.

He was appointed Executive Director on the Board of ICICI Bank at the age of 38 and became the MD and CEO of ICICI Prudential Life Insurance Co at 41. He was also the Chairman of ICICI Home Finance Co. Ltd, and served on the Board of ICICI Lombard General Insurance Company, CIBIL - India's first Credit Bureau, and SMERA- SIDBI's Credit Rating Agency.

In 2012, venturing down the entrepreneurial road, he acquired a stake in an existing NBFC, then secured an equity backing of Rs. 8.10 billion from Warburg Pincus and thus founded Capital First Limited. Today, he is the Executive Chairman and Managing Director of this successful Retail NBFC.

During this period, he has grown the total loan book from Rs.9.35 billion to Rs.295.68 billion (as of 30 June 2018), of which retail financing which grew from Rs.0.94 billion to Rs.272.2 billion (as on 30 June 2018), has grown the Market Cap from Rs.7.9 billion (as on 31 March 2012) to Rs.60.96 bn (as on 31 March 2018), reduced the NPA from 5.28% to 1.72% (90 DPD recognition norm), and got the long term credit rating upgraded to AAA. (Rs. 1.00 billion = USD 15 million @ US$1 = Rs. 66.7)

In line with V. Vaidyanathan's objective and long-term plan of getting a banking license, on 13 January 2018, in a joint press release issued by IDFC Bank and Capital First, announced a merger. IDFC Bank is to issue 139 shares for every 10 shares of Capital First and Mr. Vaidyanathan will take over as the MD and CEO of the combined bank.

Philanthropy 
In January 2018, he announced to the exchanges under regulation 7(2) read with Regulation 6(2) of the Securities and Exchange Board of India (Prohibition of insider trading) that he had donated half a million shares of Capital First of his personal wealth to Rukmini Foundation which is a social welfare trust to support activities providing education and healthcare support for economically underprivileged children and other such charitable causes. The stock was valued Rs. 400 million Indian Rupees at the prevailing stock price on the date of the transfer. Some of the initial beneficiaries of the trust are Genesis Foundation which works on the healthcare of children, Samparc who works on rehabilitation and education of children, and Apnalaya which works in the area of education of slum children in Mumbai.

According to company stock exchange filing under regulation 7(2) read with Regulation 6(2) of Securities and Exchange Board of India (Prohibition of insider trading) in November 2018, Vaidyanathan informed that he gifted an additional 4.29 lakh shares to drivers, maids, present as well former colleagues and family members. The stock was valued Rs. 200 million Indian Rupees at the prevailing stock price on the date of the transfer. V Vaidyanathan has gifted Rs. 68 crores of his wealth.

Personal life 
He was born to a family of four siblings. His siblings joined the Indian Air Force and the Indian Army like their father who was also associated with the Indian Air Force. Vaidyanathan, on the other hand, was the first to join the private sector. Apart from his professional commitments, V. Vaidyanathan is an active marathoner. He has till now run 8 full marathons and 22 half marathons. In his spare time, he strums the guitar and occasionally plays golf. He lives in Mumbai with his family consisting of his father, wife, and three children.

In February 2022, Vaidyanathan gifted shares worth Rs 4 Crore to five of IDFC First's employees, including help and a driver. This was not the first time he attempted to help his staff members, as in May of 2021, he gave away 4.3 Lakh shares, worth over 2.4 Crore to three persons from IDFC First Bank to help them buy a house. Similar episodes of him giving away shares to his employees have happened in the past too.

Awards and recognition 

 "CEO of the year 2018" by Businessworld
 "Outstanding Corporate Transformation India 2018" by Capital Finance International
 "V Vaidyanathan: Most Inspirational Management Buyout India 2018" by Capital Finance International
 "Game Changers of India" – Economic Times Global Business Summit 2018 
 "Entrepreneur of the Year Award" at APEA 2017
 "Economic Times Most Promising Business Leaders of Asia" at the Asian Business Leaders Conclave 2016, Malaysia
 "Outstanding Entrepreneur Award" in Asia Pacific Entrepreneurship Awards 2016
 "Leaders Under 40" from Business Today in 2009
 CNBC Awaaz Entrepreneur of the year 2020
 Most Promising Entrepreneur of the Year in the Editorial Board Category- CNBC Awaaz CEO Awards 2019 
 Most Harmonious Merger Award, MD & CEO India – The European Magazine (CFI) 2018
 2022 Ernst & Young Entrepreneur of the Year Award (Financial Services)

References

External links 
 Capital First Website

1968 births
Living people
Birla Institute of Technology, Mesra alumni
Indian bankers
Indian male marathon runners
IDFC First Bank